Nanukton Island is an island located within Coronation Gulf, south of Victoria Island, in the Kitikmeot Region, Nunavut, Canada.

Other islands in the vicinity include Anchor Island, Duke of York Archipelago, Haodlon Island, Hatoayok Island, Hokagon Island, Kabviukvik Island, Kingak Island, Mangak Island, Nanortut Island, and Takhoalok Island.

References

 Nanukton Island, Nunavut, at Natural Resources Canada

Islands of Coronation Gulf
Uninhabited islands of Kitikmeot Region